The Universidad de las Américas, Asociación Civil (UDLA, A.C.), is a university located in Mexico City, Mexico. It was founded in 1940 as the Mexico City College (MCC). In 1963, its name was changed to the University of the Americas and in 1968 to the Universidad de las Américas.

Since its founding it has been located first in rented buildings at the Colonia Roma in Mexico City, in the 1950s and later on in an 8-acre campus located on the Mexico-Toluca road.  In the 1970s it moved to a new campus in the State of Puebla, where it stayed until 1985 when the Board of Associates decided to move to Mexico City and separate from the Universidad de las Américas Puebla.

At the present time the university continues its bilingual nature (English–Spanish) being the only institution in Mexico with that characteristic.

International classifications 
The Universidad de las Américas, A.C., in Mexico City, is qualified as follows in the national lists published in Mexican newspapers Reforma and El Universal en 2012:

 Psychology: 2nd place in Reforma and 2nd place in El Universal
 Business administration: 7th place in Reforma and 2nd place in El Universal
 Information systems: 4th place in Reforma and no evaluation in El Universal
 International relations: 6th place in Reforma and 4th place in El Universal
 Mass media: 8th place in Reforma and 2nd place in El Universal
 Law: 11th place in El Universal and no evaluation in Reforma

The program in special education is not evaluated in the surveys.

Accreditation 
The Universidad de las Américas, A.C., is accredited by the following associations

At national level:
 The Ministry of Public Education Secretaría de Educación Pública (SEP in Spanish) Grants to BA, specialty, master and doctorate the Recognition of Official Validity (RVOE in Spanish).
 The National Association of Universities and Higher Educations Institutions (ANUIES in Spanish), Accredited since 1998.
 Federation of Mexican Private Institutions of Higher Education, (FIMPES) accredited for the 2006-2012 period.
 National Council for Teaching and Research in Psychology (CNEIP) Consejo Nacional para la Enseñanza e Investigación en Psicología (CNEIP)
 Council for the Accreditation of Communication A.C. (CONAC) Consejo de Acreditación de la Comunicación A.C. (CONAC)
 Accrediting Council in the Teaching of Accounting and Management, A.C. (CACECA) Consejo de Acreditación en la Enseñanza de la Contaduría y Administración A.C. (CACECA)
 Association for the Accreditation and Certification in Social Sciences, A.C. (ACCESISO) Asociación para la Acreditación y Certificación en Ciencias Sociales, A.C. (ACCESISO)
 National Council for the Accreditation of Higher Education in Law, A.C. (CONFEDE) Consejo Nacional para la Acreditacion de la Educación Superior en Derecho, A.C. (CONFEDE)

At the international level:
 Southern Association of Colleges and Schools (SACS)

Academic programs

Continuing education 

The Universidad de las Americas offers continuing education courses and diploma programs in management, education, psychology, science and technology and law.

Outstanding graduates 
Erik Mora, Sports Director for Telemundo 39, Sports Anchor and Video Journalist
 Ricardo Blanco, Products Communication Manager for Latin America in YouTube and Google
 Mauricio Cabrera, General editor, [mediotiempo.com] (Expansión Editorial Group)
 Carlos M. Hernández, General Manager México and Central America Abbott Diagnostics
 José Isabel Benítez, General Manager for Business and Services, Price Shoes
 Raúl Toscano, Human Resources Director for Mexico and Latin America of the  Swiss Bank
 Benilde Muro, Human Resources manager at   HSBC London, UK
 Ana Paula Blanco, Chief of the area of Communication and Public Business for North America and the United States, Google
 Mónica Ochoa, General director for Asia and Pacific, Mexican Foreign Service, Servicio Exterior Mexicano
 Lilia del Carmen Morales, consul in Leamington, Ontario
 Juan Carlos Méndez, Legal director at Prudential Seguros
 Mauricio Domingo, Legal vicepresident at Herbalife International de México, S.A de C.V.
 Nancy Bernal, Director of International Affairs of the Instituto Nacional para el Federalismo y el Desarrollo Municipal (Inafed) of the Interior Ministry Secretaría de Gobernación.
 Fernando Barocio, Legal director of the El Universal
 Cynthia Corro, Manager of the legal department of Casa Cuervo
 Rodrigo Caraballo, Director of judicial affairs of the Instituto Politécnico Nacional
 Gilberto Carrillo, Chief of Information auditing in Radiomóvil DIPSA, S.A de C.V. (Telcel)
 Leonor McCall-Rodriguez, Executive Director, Regis University Dual Language Campus
 Antonio Briceño Ortiz, Division CFO, International Sales Division Daimler Trucks North America
 Oriol Pi-Sunyer, Professor Emeritus, University of Massachusetts Amherst Department of Anthropology

References

External links 

 University Homepage (in Spanish)

Educational institutions established in 1940
Universities in Mexico City
1940 establishments in Mexico